"The Thing I Like" is a song recorded by American singer Aaliyah for her debut studio album Age Ain't Nothing but a Number (1994). It was written and produced by R. Kelly. The song appeared on the soundtrack for the film A Low Down Dirty Shame (1994). It was released as the fifth and final single from Age Ain't Nothing but a Number exclusively in the United Kingdom on August 28, 1995, by Blackground Records and Jive Records.

A moderate commercial success, "The Thing I Like" peaked at number 33 on the UK Singles Chart, becoming her fifth consecutive top-40 single in the United Kingdom.

Critical reception
In a review of the A Low Down Dirty Shame soundtrack, David Browne from Entertainment Weekly felt that "The Thing I Like", along with others, was "more workmanlike than inspired".

Commercial performance 
"The Thing I Like" was released as the fifth and final single from Age Ain't Nothing but a Number exclusively in the United Kingdom, being Aaliyah's second consecutive UK-only single. It debuted and peaked at number 33 on the UK Singles Chart dated September 9, 1995. The same week, it debuted and peaked at number four on the UK R&B Singles Chart. Additionally, it peaked at number 15 on the UK Dance Singles Chart the following week.

Track listings and formats
UK 12-inch vinyl
 "The Thing I Like" (album version) – 3:21
 "The Thing I Like" (Paul Gotel's Classic Anthem Mix) – 6:48
 "The Thing I Like" (Paul Gotel's Deep & Dubby Mix) – 6:29
 "The Thing I Like" (PG Tips Satellite Mix) – 7:21

UK maxi CD single
 "The Thing I Like" (album version) – 3:21
 "The Thing I Like" (Paul Gotel's Radio Mix) – 3:57
 "The Thing I Like" (Paul Gotel's Classic Anthem Mix) – 6:48
 "The Thing I Like" (PG Tips Satellite Mix) – 7:21
 "The Thing I Like" (Paul Gotel's Deep & Dubby Mix) – 6:29

Charts

Release history

References

1993 songs
1995 singles
Aaliyah songs
Songs written by R. Kelly
Song recordings produced by R. Kelly
Blackground Records singles